Colfax is a town in Perry Township, Clinton County, Indiana, United States. The population was 691 at the 2010 census.  The town was originally known as Midway since it was a half-way point on the IC&L Railroad between Chicago & Louisville. Railways intersected North/South & East/West making Colfax a popular transfer destination. The town was renamed to honor Vice President Schuyler Colfax in 1857.

History
Colfax was laid out in 1849 by Montgomery Stroud. It was originally named Midway for its position between Chicago and Louisville along the IC&L railroad.  In 1853 the town gained a post office named Colfax, and in December 1857 the name of the town itself became Colfax, by petition of the residents.  By 1861 the town had two churches, two general stores, a hotel, a saw mill and approximately 200 residents.

An incorporation election held December 25, 1869, resulted in 24 yeas and 1 no.  The town had 187 residents in 1870, but with the construction of the Vandalia railroad through town in 1870-71 it grew quickly and by 1880 had a population of 638.

The Colfax Carnegie Library and Rosenberger Building are listed on the National Register of Historic Places.

Geography
Colfax is located at  (40.193788, -86.668085).

Demographics

2010 census
As of the census of 2010, there were 691 people, 268 households, and 194 families living in the town. The racial makeup of the town was 96.1% White, 0.4% African American, 0.7% Asian, 0.3% from other races, and 2.5% from two or more races. Hispanic or Latino of any race were 3.2% of the population.

There were 268 households, of which 37.3% had children under the age of 18 living with them, 53.7% were married couples living together, 12.3% had a female householder with no husband present, 6.3% had a male householder with no wife present, and 27.6% were non-families. 23.5% of all households were made up of individuals, and 10.1% had someone living alone who was 65 years of age or older. The average household size was 2.58 and the average family size was 3.01.

The median age in the town was 40.1 years. 25.2% of residents were under the age of 18; 7.9% were between the ages of 18 and 24; 25.1% were from 25 to 44; 26.6% were from 45 to 64; and 15.2% were 65 years of age or older. The gender makeup of the town was 47.2% male and 52.8% female.

2000 census
As of the census of 2000, there were 768 people, 286 households, and 205 families living in the town. The racial makeup of the town was 99.87% White and 0.13% Asian. Hispanic or Latino of any race were 1.69% of the population.

There were 286 households, out of which 36.0% had children under the age of 18 living with them, 59.8% were married couples living together, 7.0% had a female householder with no husband present, and 28.3% were non-families. 23.1% of all households were made up of individuals, and 11.9% had someone living alone who was 65 years of age or older. The average household size was 2.69 and the average family size was 3.18.

In the town, the population was spread out, with 29.3% under the age of 18, 7.6% from 18 to 24, 29.7% from 25 to 44, 21.1% from 45 to 64, and 12.4% who were 65 years of age or older. The median age was 34 years. For every 100 females, there were 95.4 males. For every 100 females age 18 and over, there were 93.9 males.

The median income for a household in the town was $42,688, and the median income for a family was $44,514. Males had a median income of $31,792 versus $28,000 for females. The per capita income for the town was $14,482. About 6.7% of families and 7.8% of the population were below the poverty line, including 5.5% of those under age 18 and 10.1% of those age 65 or over.

Education
The town has a free lending library, the Colfax-Perry Township Public Library.

References

Towns in Clinton County, Indiana
Towns in Indiana
Populated places established in 1849
1849 establishments in Indiana